The Vulture (original Hungarian title Dögkeselyű) is a 1982 Hungarian crime film directed by Ferenc András. It was entered into the 33rd Berlin International Film Festival.

Soundtrack 
Its melody is very similar to that of Airport by The Motors, although whether this is coincidental is not known.

Cast
 György Cserhalmi as József Simon
 Hédi Temessy as Mrs. Halmos, née Mária Roska
 Zita Perczel as Mrs. Szántó, née Erzsébet Roska, Mária's sister
 Maria Gladkowska as Cecília, Mária's daughter
 Mari Kiss as Cecília (voice)
 Ferenc Bács as Előd Kowarski gangster boos
 Péter Blaskó as Lt. Siska
 Marianna Moór as Mrs. Kowarski
 Vera Pap as Kati
 László Szabó as Capt. Kovács
 Dorottya Udvaros as Ági the prostitute
 Frigyes Hollósi as colleague of Lt. Siska
 János Katona as Det. Gyetvai
 Tibor Kristóf as colleague of Lt. Siska
 Dénes Ujlaky as garagemaster

References

External links

1982 films
1980s Hungarian-language films
1980s crime films
Films directed by Ferenc András
Hungarian crime films